Hayden V. White (July 12, 1928 – March 5, 2018) was an American historian in the tradition of literary criticism, perhaps most famous for his work Metahistory: The Historical Imagination in Nineteenth-Century Europe (1973/2014).

Career
White received his Bachelor of Arts degree from Wayne State University (1951) and his Master of Arts (1952) and Doctor of Philosophy (1955) degrees from the University of Michigan. While an undergraduate at Wayne State, White studied history under William J. Bossenbrook alongside then-classmate Arthur Danto.

In 1998, White directed a seminar ("The Theory of the Text") at the School of Criticism and Theory.

He was elected to the American Academy of Arts and Sciences in 1991. In 2000, he was elected to the American Philosophical Society.

Among White's influences, there were two major figures who taught him "how the historian interprets something." The first was William J. Bossenbrook, who taught White as an undergraduate at Wayne State University. Bossenbrook saw history as fundamentally a story of the conflict between ideas, values, and dreams. Therefore, Bossenbrook regarded history as a mystery to be constantly pondered and studied rather than a puzzle to be solved. In his last book, The Practical Past (2014), White paid tribute to the significant effect of Bossenbrook. The second was 12th-century Jewish philosopher Moses Maimonides, particularly his interpretation of the Bible. Maimonides said that since the creation is vast and complex, and God's will is beyond human's understanding, the goal of biblical interpretation should be to maximize possible interpretations. With this influence, White enjoyed comparing historians' tasks. The influence of Maimonides helped White focus on a variety of possible interpretations of history, not limited or prescribed history, which diminishes the possibility of interpretation.

Metahistory (1973) 

In his seminal 1973 book Metahistory: The Historical Imagination in Nineteenth-Century Europe, White claimed that the manifest historical text is marked by strategies of explanation, which include explanation by argument, explanation by emplotment, and explanation by ideological implication. He argued that historical writing was influenced by literary writing in many ways, sharing the strong reliance on narrative for meaning. Therefore, White contradicts the view that "historiography can be objective or truly scientific in itself, unaffected by anything."

White mentions two figures who have enabled people to ask questions about history's objectivity: Marx and Nietzsche. According to White, these thinkers both use their philosophy to consider history which “not only makes us know something about the historical process but know how it knows it." They focus on the problem of history. Marx regards the problem of history as the problem of the mode of explanation, while, for Nietzsche, the problem is the problem of the mode of emplotment. Thus, history is recorded differently depending on which mode the historian chooses. As a result, ‘a value-free history’ cannot be existed. By showing Marx’s and Nietzsche’s argument, White once again emphasizes the importance of the philosophies of history, and history as a well-made or well-constructed narrative. 

He insists, in particular in chapter 7, that philosophies of history are indispensable elements in historiography, which cannot be separated from historiography. For him, history is not simply a list of chronological events.  White also argued, however, that history is most successful when it uses this "narrativity", since it is what allows history to be meaningful. Emphasizing history as a narrative using language, he argues that true history should contain both characteristics of synchronic and diachronic.  This view is contrary to historians such as  George Peabody Gooch, and Bendetto Croce, who tried to distinguish between historiography and philosophies of history.  He ended his career as University Professor Emeritus at the history of consciousness department of the University of California, Santa Cruz, having previously retired from the comparative literature department of Stanford University.

Lawsuit against the LAPD
White figured prominently in a landmark California Supreme Court case regarding covert intelligence gathering on college campuses by police officers in the Los Angeles Police Department.  White v. Davis, 13 Cal.3d 757, 533 P.2d 222, 120 Cal. Rptr. 94 (1975).  During 1972, while a professor of history at UCLA and acting as sole plaintiff, White sued Chief of Police Edward M. Davis, alleging the illegal expenditure of public funds in connection with covert intelligence gathering by police at UCLA.  The covert activities included police officers registering as students, taking notes of discussions occurring in classes, and making police reports on these discussions.  White v. Davis, at 762.  The California Supreme Court found for White in a unanimous decision.  This case set the standard that determines the limits of legal police surveillance of political activity in California; police cannot engage in such surveillance in the absence of reasonable suspicion of a crime ("Lockyer Manual").

Works

While Hayden White is especially known for his analysis of 19th century historiography, his work concerning historical narratives in a more general sense are equally important. The Content of the Form is a collection of essays by White. It shifts his focus in the direction of identifying the importance of narratives in history.

Bibliography
 Ed. Robert Doran, Fwd. Judith Butler

 
 Ed. Robert Doran

"Historiography and Historiophoty", The American Historical Review, Vol. 93, No. 5 (Dec., 1988), pp. 1193–1199 (online). 

"Historical Pluralism", Critical Inquiry, Vol. 12, No. 3 (Spring, 1986), pp. 480–493.
"The Question of Narrative in Contemporary Historical Theory", History and Theory, Vol. 23, No. 1 (Feb., 1984), pp. 1–33.
"The Politics of Historical Interpretation: Discipline and De-Sublimation", Critical Inquiry, Vol. 9, No. 1, The Politics of Interpretation (Sep., 1982), pp. 113–137. 
as editor (1982) with Margaret Brose 
"The Value of Narrativity in the Representation of Reality", Critical Inquiry, Vol. 7, No. 1, On Narrative (Autumn, 1980), pp. 5–27.

"Interpretation in History", New Literary History, Vol. 4, No. 2, On Interpretation: II (Winter, 1973), pp. 281–314.
"Foucault Decoded: Notes from Underground", History and Theory, Vol. 12, No. 1 (1973), pp. 23–54. 

as co-author (1970) with Willson Coates, The Ordeal of Liberal Humanism: An Intellectual History of Western Europe, vol. II: Since the French Revolution. New York: McGraw-Hill, 1970.
as co-editor (1969) with Giorgio Tagliacozzo, Giambattista Vico: An International Symposium. Baltimore and London: Johns Hopkins University Press.
as editor 
"The burden of history", History and Theory, Vol. 5, No. 2 (1966), pp. 111–134.
as co-author (1966) with Willson Coates and J. Salwin Schapiro, The Emergence of Liberal Humanism. An Intellectual History of Western Europe, vol. I: From the Italian Renaissance to the French Revolution. New York: McGraw-Hill, 1966.

References

Further reading
 Doran, Robert (ed.). Philosophy of History After Hayden White, London: Bloomsbury, 2013. 
Re-Figuring Hayden White, Edited by Frank Ankersmit, Ewa Domanska, and Hans Kellner. 
 Doran, Robert. "Metahistory and the Ethics of Historiography," Storia della Storiografia, 65.1 (2014): 153-162.
 Doran, Robert. "The Work of Hayden White I: Mimesis, Figuration, and the Writing of History", The SAGE Handbook of Historical Theory, ed. Nancy Partner and Sarah Foot (London: Sage Publications, 2013): 106-118.
 
 Ghasemi, Mehdi. “Revisiting History in Hayden White’s Philosophy.” SAGE Open, 2014, 4(3), July–September: 1-7. 
Paul, Herman. Hayden White: The Historical Imagination (Key Contemporary Thinkers), Cambridge: Polity Press, 2011. 
Pihlainen, Kalle. The Work of History: Constructivism and a Politics of the Past (with a Foreword by Hayden White), New York: Routledge, 2017. 
 Pihlainen, Kalle. "The Work of Hayden White II: Defamiliarizing Narrative." The SAGE Handbook of Historical Theory, ed. Nancy Partner and Sarah Foot (London: Sage Publications, 2013): 119–135.
 Pihlainen, Kalle. "History in the world: Hayden White and the consumer of history”, Rethinking History 12:1 (2008), 23–39.
 Daddow, Oliver. "Exploding history: Hayden White on disciplinization", Rethinking History: The Journal of Theory and Practice, 1470-1154, Volume 12, Issue 1, 2008, pp. 41–58.
 Finney, Patrick. "Hayden White and the Tragedy of International History", Paper presented at the annual meeting of the International Studies Association's 49th Annual Convention; San Francisco, CA, USA, March 26, 2008.
"Hayden White Talks Trash", Interview by Frederick Aldama, Issue #55, May 2001.

External links

Bibliography of Hayden White.
Another Bibliography of Hayden White
Hayden V. White Papers at University of California, Santa Cruz Special Collections

1928 births
2018 deaths
People from Martin, Tennessee
University of Michigan alumni
Wayne State University alumni
Writers from Tennessee
American historians
Historiographers
Philosophers of history
Postmodernists
Fellows of the American Academy of Arts and Sciences
University of California, Santa Cruz faculty
Stanford University Department of Comparative Literature faculty
Trope theorists
Giambattista Vico scholars
Members of the American Philosophical Society